Murray is both a Scottish and an Irish surname with two distinct respective etymologies. The Scottish version is a common variation of the word Moray, an anglicisation of the Medieval Gaelic word Muireb (or Moreb); the b here was pronounced as v, hence the Latinization to Moravia. These names denote the district on the south shore of the Moray Firth, in Scotland. Murray is a direct transliteration of how Scottish people pronounce the word Moray. The Murray spelling is not used for the geographical area, which is Moray, but it became the commonest form of the surname, especially among Scottish emigrants, to the extent that the surname Murray is now much more common than the original surname Moray. See also Clan Murray.

In addition to the Scottish derivation, the Irish version may derive from Ó Muireadhaigh, Mac Muireadhaigh. and Mac Giolla Mhuire.

History
A considerable number of present bearers of this surname are of Scottish origin, especially in Ulster. Possible etymologies are:
 From Moray in northeast Scotland, which came from the Scottish Gaelic for "sea settlement".
 As a native Irish of this name, from Mac Muireadhaigh or Ó Muireadhaigh "descendant of Muireadhach" or Mac Giolla Mhuire "descendant of the servant of the Virgin Mary".

The motto for Murray is Imperio. "Murrays" trace their heritage back to the 12th century and take their name from the province of Moray, once a local kingdom. It was during this time that the Flemish lords crossed the North Sea and established themselves in the Scottish realm. Among them was Freskin. It is possible that either Freskin or his son William intermarried with the ancient royal house of Moray. The senior line of the Murrays took the surname of Sutherland and became Earls of Sutherland by 1235.

Thereafter, the chiefs of the Murrays were the Lords of Petty in Moray, who also became Lords of Bothwell in Clydesdale before 1253. An heir of this line, Sir Andrew Moray, was the brilliant young general who led the Scots in 1297 in their first uprising against English rule. He was mortally wounded while winning his famous victory at the Battle of Stirling Bridge.

His son, Sir Andrew Murray, 4th Lord of Bothwell, third Regent of Scotland, married Christian Bruce, a sister of King Robert the Bruce. He was captured at Roxburgh early in 1333 and was a prisoner in England at the time of the Battle of Halidon Hill. He obtained his freedom in time to march to the relief of his wife, who was defending Kildrummy Castle. Sir Andrew commenced with unabated spirit to struggle in the cause of independence and died in 1338.

The last Murray Lord of Bothwell died in 1360 of the plague. By the 16th century, the Murrays of Tullibardine in Strathearn had assumed the leadership of the Murrays. This was formally confirmed by Bands of Association in 1586 and 1589.

Sir John became the 1st Earl of Tullibardine in 1606. Thus, the Tullibardine hegemony was firmly established among the Murrays; and George Iain Murray, 10th Duke of Atholl was also Marquis of Tullibardine as recognized in Lyon Register as Chief of the Murrays. The 2nd Earl of Tullibardine William Murray, 1574 circa – 1628, married Lady Dorothea Stewart, heiress of the Earls of Atholl in 1629 and Marquises from 1676. To their medieval peacock's head crest (motto-Praite), they added the mermaid (motto-Tout Pret), as Lords of Balquidder; and in the seventeenth century, they took the demi-savage holding a sword and a key commemorating the capture of the last Lord of the Isles by the 1st Stewart Earl of Atholl in 1475: hence the motto Furth, Fortune, and Fill the Fetters. (Go forth against your enemies, have good fortune, and return with hostages and booty).

Since 1703, the Murray's chiefs have been Dukes of Atholl. For a time in the 18th century, the Murray dukes were also Sovereign Lords of the Isle of Man, with their own coinage and parliament, The House of Keys. The 1st Duke's younger son, Lord George Murray, was the Jacobite general responsible for the highlander's successes through the early part of the 1745 uprising.

Much of the above information about the Murrays was taken from the book The Highland Clans, by Iain Moncreiffe of that Ilk.

Lord George's descendant George Murray, 10th Duke of Atholl, died in February 1996. The new Duke of Atholl is John Murray, 11th Duke of Atholl, a South African. The new Duke has taken the chiefship of the Murrays.

People

Murray may refer to many people (see also Clan Murray):

A
Aaron Murray (born 1990), American football player
Adam Murray (born 1981), English footballer
Adam Murray, Irish soldier known for the 1689 defence of Derry
Al Murray, comedian
Albert Murray, including:
Albert Murray (writer) (1916–2013), African American literary and jazz critic, novelist and biographer
Albert Murray, Baron Murray of Gravesend (1930–1980), British Labour Party politician, Member of Parliament 1964– 1970
Bert Murray (born 1942), English football player
Alexander Murray (1755–1821), U.S. Navy officer, Revolutionary War
Alexander Murray (1816–1884), U.S. Navy officer, Mexican-American and American Civil Wars
Alexander Murray (geologist) (1810–1884), Scottish geologist
Alexander Murray (linguist) (1775–1813), linguist and professor at Edinburgh University
Alexander Murray, 1st Baron Murray of Elibank (1870–1920)
Alexander Murray, 6th Earl of Dunmore (1804–1845)
Alexander Murray, 8th Earl of Dunmore (1871–1962)
Alexander Borthwick Murray (1816–1903), South Australian colonist, pastoralist and parliamentarian
Alexander Howison Murray Jr. (1907–1993), mayor of Placerville, California
Alexander Hunter Murray (1818 or 1819–1874), a Hudson's Bay Company fur trader and artist
Alexander Stuart Murray (1841–1904), archaeologist
Aline Murray Kilmer (1888–1941), American poet
Allan Murray (born 1982), Australian rules footballer
Alma Murray, (1854–1945), English actress
Andrew Murray, including:
Sir Andrew Murray, Guardian of Scotland in 1332 and again from 1335 to 1338
Andrew Murray (naturalist) (1812–1878), Scottish lawyer and scientist
Andrew Murray (Guyanese boxer) (1971–2002), Guyanese boxer of the 1990s and 2000s
Andrew Murray (trade unionist) (born 1958), Chair of the Stop the War Coalition and former member of the Communist Party of Britain
Andrew Murray (children's writer) (born 1970), English children's writer
Andrew Murray (golfer) (born 1956), English golfer
Andrew Murray (minister) (1828–1917), South African minister of religion, missionary, and author
Andrew Murray (Australian politician) (born 1947), Australian politician, current member of the Australian Senate
Andrew Murray, 1st Viscount Dunedin (1849–1942)
Andy Murray (ice hockey) (born 1951), Canadian ice hockey player, coach
Sir Andy Murray (born 1987), British tennis player
Ann Murray (born 1949), Irish mezzo-soprano
Anna Evans Murray (1857–1955), American advocate for early childhood education
Anne Murray (born 1945), Canadian singer
Anne Murray, Duchess of Atholl (1814–1897)
Anton Murray (1922–1995), South African cricketer
Antonio Murray (born 1984), English football player
Antonio Murray (police officer) (born 1971), former Baltimore Police officer sentenced to 139 years in prison
Archibald Murray
Sir Archibald Murray, 3rd Baronet (d. before 1777), Scottish soldier
 Archibald Wright Murray (1811–1892) (Rev. A.W. Murray), missionary, see Coming of the Light
Archibald Murray (1860–1945), British general
Archibald R. Murray (1933–2001), African American lawyer 
Arnold Murray, including:
Arnold Murray (pastor) (born 1927), founder and pastor, The Shepherd's Chapel
 Arnold Murray (1854–1952), one of the Last surviving Confederate veterans
 Arnold Murray (1933–1989), lover of Alan Turing, prosecuted for homosexual activity
Arthur Murray (1895–1991), American dance instructor and businessman, married to Kathryn Murray
Arthur Murray, 3rd Viscount Elibank (1879–1962)
Athol Murray (1892–1975), Canadian priest and high school president
Lady Augusta Murray (1761–1830)

B
Barbara Murray (1929–2014), actress
Bert Murray (born 1942), English football player
Bill Murray (born 1950), American actor
Billy Murray (actor) (born 1941), British actor
Billy Murray (singer) (1877–1954), American singer
Bob Murray (businessman) (born 1946), businessman and former chairman of Sunderland Football Club
Bobby Murray (musician) (born 1953), American electric blues guitarist, songwriter and record producer
Brady Murray (born 1984), American ice hockey player
Braham Murray (1943–2018), English theatre director
Brendan Murray (born 1996), Irish singer
 Brendan Murray (born 1995), known as Bighead (producer), American record producer
Brett Murray (born 1961), South African artist
Brian Doyle-Murray (born 1945), American comedian, screenwriter and actor
Bruce C. Murray (1931–2013), American planetary scientist
Bruce Murray (cricketer) (born 1940), New Zealand cricketer
Bruce Murray (soccer) (born 1966), American soccer player
Bryan Murray (ice hockey) (1942–2017), Canadian ice hockey coach and executive

C
Calesha "Bre-Z" Murray (born 1987), American actress and rapper
Chad Michael Murray (born 1981), American actor, former male fashion model and teen idol
Charles Murray (disambiguation)
Charles R. Murray (1882–1938), Canadian professional golfer
 Charlotte Murray (1754–1808), English botanist and author better known as Lady Charlotte Murray
Charlotte Murray, Duchess of Atholl (1731–1805)
Cheryl Murray (born 1952), British actress
Chris Murray (born 1966), Canadian singer-songwriter and guitarist
Christian Murray, Canadian comedy writer
Christy Murray, musician
Clark Murray (born 1938), American sculptor
Colin Murray (born 1977), presenter
Conor Murray (born 1989), Irish rugby union player
Conrad Murray (born 1953), personal physician of Michael Jackson
Craig Murray (born 1958), former British Ambassador to Uzbekistan
Cristiane Murray (born 1962), Brazilian journalist and Vice Director of the Holy See Press Office

D
Dana Murray (Missouri politician) (born 1946), American politician from Missouri 
Daniel Murray (mathematician) (1862–1934) Canadian mathematician
Daniel Alexander Payne Murray (1852–1925), African American intellectual
Darren Murray (born 1974), Scottish footballer
Darrin Murray (born 1967), New Zealand cricketer
Dave Murray (musician) (born 1956), Iron Maiden guitarist
David Murray (disambiguation)
David Christie Murray (1847–1907), English journalist and writer
David Murray-Lyon (1890–1975), officer in the Indian Army
Dee Murray (1946–1992), British bassist, best known as a member of Elton John's original rock band
Dejounte Murray (born 1996), American basketball player
Denis Murray (journalist) (born 1951), British television journalist
DeMarco Murray (born 1988), Dallas Cowboys running back
Denis Murray (athlete) (1881–1944), Irish athlete at the 1908 Olympic Games in London
Deryck Murray (born 1943),  former West Indies cricketer
Devon Murray (born 1988), Irish actor
Don Murray (clarinetist) (1904–1929), American jazz musician
Don Murray (actor) (born 1929), American actor
Don Murray (writer) (1923–2006), Pulitzer Prize–winning writer for the Boston Herald
Donald Walter Gordon Murray (1894–1976), Canadian surgeon
Douglas Murray (ice hockey) (born 1980), Swedish ice hockey player
Durno Murray (1925–2009), Australian ornithologist

E
Earl Murray (1926–1994), American football player
Ed Murray (Washington politician) (born 1955), politician from Washington State
Eddie Murray (born 1956), American baseball player
Eddie Murray (American football) (born 1956)
Edmund P. Murray (1930–2007), American novelist and journalist
Edwin R. Murray (born 1960), American politician
Eileen Murray (born 1958), American hedge fund executive
Elaine Murray (born 1954), Scottish politician
Eli Houston Murray (1843–1896), Governor of Utah Territory  (1880–1886)
Elisabeth Murray (1909–1998), English biographer and educationist
Eoin Murray (born 1982), Irish auto racing driver
Eric Murray (bridge) (1928–2018), Canadian bridge player
Eric Murray (cricketer) (1893–1971), South African cricketer
Eric Murray (footballer) (1941–2016)
Eric Murray (rower) (born 1982), New Zealand rower
Eunice Murray (1878–1960), Scottish suffrage campaigner, author, folklorist. First Scottish woman to stand in the first election open to women in 1918.
Eustace Clare Grenville Murray (1824–1881), English journalist

F
Francis Murray (1838–1872), mayor of Brisbane
Francis Edwin Murray (1854–1932), poet
Francis Joseph Murray (1911–1996), American mathematician known for his foundational work on functional analysis
Frank Murray (1885–1951), coach of the Virginia Cavaliers
Franny Murray (1915–1998), American football player
Fraser Murray (born 1999), Scottish footballer
Frieda A. Murray (born 1948), fantasy writer

G
Garth Murray (born 1982), Canadian ice hockey player
Geoffrey Cushing-Murray (born 1946), American songwriter
George Murray (disambiguation)
Gideon Oliphant-Murray, 2nd Viscount Elibank (1877–1951)
Gilbert Murray (1866–1957), British intellectual
Gilbert Elliot-Murray-Kynynmound, 1st Earl of Minto (1751–1814)
Glen Murray (ice hockey) (born 1972), Canadian ice hockey player
Glen Murray (politician) (born 1957), Canadian politician
Glenn Murray (born 1983), English football player
Gerald R. Murray (born 1956), 14th Chief Master Sergeant of the US Air Force
Gordon Murray (born 1946), designer of Formula One race cars
Gordon Murray (puppeteer) (1921–2016), British television producer and puppeteer
K. Gordon Murray (1922–1979), American film producer
Grace H. Murray (1872–1944), American artist
Grace Hopper (1906–1992), Grace Murray Hopper, American computer scientist and United States Navy rear admiral
Graham Murray (1955–2013), Australian rugby league player and coach
Grant Murray (born 1975), Scottish professional footballer
Grover E. Murray (1916–2003), President of Texas Tech University (1966–1976)
Guillermo Murray (1927–2021), Argentine-Mexican actor and director
Guy Murray, American track/cross country coach and former marathon runner

H
Hannah Murray (born 1989), English actress
H. J. R. Murray (1868–1955), English chess historian
Harry Murray (1880–1966), Australian Victoria Cross recipient
Henry Murray (1893–1988), American psychologist who developed the Thematic Apperception Test (TAT)
Herbert Harley Murray (1829–1904), English colonial governor
Herbert Murray (footballer) (1886–1918), Scottish footballer
Hubert Murray (1861–1940), brother of Gilbert Murray
Hugh Murray (disambiguation)

I
Iain Murray (disambiguation)
Iain Murray (sailor) (born 1958), Australian olympic sailor
Ian Murray (disambiguation)

J
J. A. Murray (naturalist)
Jack Murray (disambiguation)
Jaime Murray (born 1976), English actress
Jamal Murray (born 1997), Canadian basketball player
James Murray (disambiguation)
Jamie Murray (born 1986), Scottish tennis player
Jan Murray (1916–2006), American stand-up comedian
Janet Murray (born 1946), American professor of literature, media, and communication
Janice Murray (footballer) (born 1966), English association footballer
Janice Murray (speech therapist), Professor at Manchester Metropolitan University
Janet Murray, Professor at the Georgia Institute of Technology
Jenni Murray (born 1950), British journalist and broadcaster
Jennifer Murray (born 1940), British pilot and the first woman to circumnavigate the world in a helicopter
Jillian Murray (born 1984), an American Actress
Jim Murray (football), an American football executive
Jim Murray (musician) (1942–2013), a San Francisco musician of the 1960s
Jim Murray (sportswriter) (1919–1998), American sportswriter
Jimmy Murray (offensive lineman) (born 1995), American football player
Joan Murray (born 1945), American poet
Joel Murray (born 1963), American actor
Johan Andreas Murray (1740-1791), Swedish botanist and physician
John Murray (disambiguation)
John Courtney Murray (1904–1967), American priest and theologian
John Stewart-Murray, 7th Duke of Atholl (1840–1917)
John Stewart-Murray, 8th Duke of Atholl (1871–1942)
Johnston Murray (1902–1974), Governor of Oklahoma
Jon Murray (disambiguation)
Jonathan Murray (born 1955), television producer
Joseph Murray (disambiguation)
Judith Sargent Murray (1751–1820)
Judy Murray (born 1959), Scottish tennis coach
Juggy Murray (1923–2005), American record label owner
Junior Murray (born 1968), West Indian cricketer

K
Kate Murray (born 1962), American Supervisor of Hempstead, New York
Katharine Stewart-Murray, Duchess of Atholl (1874–1960), Duchess of Atholl
Keegan Murray (born 2000), American basketball player
Keith Murray (disambiguation), multiple people
Ken Murray (disambiguation), multiple people
Kenneth Murray (disambiguation), multiple people
Kevin Murray (disambiguation), multiple people
Kyler Murray (born 1997), American football and baseball player

L
Lamond Murray (born 1973), basketball player
Larry Murray (born 1947), Canadian civil servant
Lawrence J. Murray, Jr. (1910–2000), New York politician
Lawrence O. Murray, U.S. Comptroller of the Currency from 1908 to 1913
Lee Murray (born 1977), a British mixed martial arts fighter of partial Moroccan descent.
Len Murray (Lionel Murray, Baron Murray of Epping Forest, 1922–2004), British Trade Union leader
Lenda Murray (born 1962), American female bodybuilder
Les Murray (broadcaster) (1945–2017), Hungarian-Australian sports journalist
Les Murray (poet) (1938–2019), Australian poet
Leticia Murray (born 1979), Mexican actress
Lindley Murray (1745–1826), American lawyer
Lindley Murray (tennis) (1892–1970), American tennis player
Liz Murray (born 1980), American inspirational speaker
Louise Murray (1854–1931), American local historian and museum director
Lowell Murray (born 1936), Canadian politician
Lynn Murray, Scottish actress
Lynne Murray, British psychopathologist and academic

M
Madalyn Murray O'Hair (1919–1995), American atheist
Mae Murray (1885–1965), American actress, dancer, film producer, and screenwriter
Magnus Miller Murray (1787–1838), Mayor of Pittsburgh, Pennsylvania
Margaret Murray (1863–1963), British Egyptologist
Margaret Murray (baseball) (died 2006), All-American Girls Professional Baseball League player
Margaret Polson Murray (1865–1927), Canadian social reformer, magazine editor, and founder of the Imperial Order Daughters of the Empire
Margaret Lally "Ma" Murray (1888–1982) American-Canadian newspaper editor, publisher, and columnist
Margaret Murray Washington (1865–1925), principal of Tuskegee Normal and Industrial Institute
Mark Murray (disambiguation)
Marty Murray (born 1975), Canadian hockey player
Matt Murray (disambiguation)
Matt Murray (ice hockey, born 1994), Canadian ice hockey goalie x2 Stanley Cup champion for the Ottawa Senators of the NHL
Matthew Murray (1765–1826), English steam engine and machine tool manufacturer
Maura Murray (born 1982), American woman who disappeared in 2004
Michael Murray (organist) (born 1943), American musician and writer
Mike Murray (cricketer) (born 1930), English banker, cricketer, and administrator
Mike Murray (ice hockey) (born 1966), Canadian hockey player and coach
Mitch Murray (born 1940), English songwriter, record producer, and author
Mitchell Durno Murray (1925–2009), Australian veterinary scientist and ornithologist
Montolieu Oliphant-Murray, 1st Viscount Elibank (1840–1927), Scottish nobleman

N
Nathan Lovett-Murray (born 1982), Australian rules footballer
Nathaniel A. Murray
Nathaniel O. Murray (1834–1882), American politician
Neil Murray (Australian musician) (born 1956)
Neil Murray (British musician) (born 1950)

P
Patrick Murray (disambiguation)
Patty Murray (Patricia Lynn Murray, born 1950), United States Senator
Paul Murray (disambiguation)
Paula Murray (born 1958), Canadian ceramic artist
Pauli Murray Anna Pauline "Pauli" Murray (1910–1985), American civil rights activist
Peta Murray (born 1958), Australian writer
Pete Murray (Australian singer-songwriter) (born 1969), Australian singer-songwriter
Pete Murray (DJ) (born 1925), English disc jockey
Peter Murray (Harvard Law School), Harvard Law professor
Peter Murray-Rust (born 1941), English chemist, open data activist
Philip Murray (1886–1952), Scottish-born steelworker and American labor leader
Philip H. Murray (1842–1917), American journalist, phrenologist, and civil rights activist
Philip I. Murray, English ophthalmologist

R
Raymond Murray (1913–2004), American Marine Corps officer
Red Murray (1884–1958), American baseball player
Rem Murray (born 1972), Canadian ice hockey player
Richard Murray (disambiguation)
Rob Murray (born 1967), Canadian ice hockey player
Robert Murray (disambiguation)
Robin Murray (born 1944), British psychiatrist
Ronald Murray (born 1979), American basketball player
Ronald King Murray, Lord Murray (1922–2016), Scottish politician and judge
Ruby Murray (1935–1996), Northern Ireland singer
Rupert Murray (born 1969), film director
Russell Mervyn Murray (1877–1945), mine manager in Mount Lyell, Tasmania
Ryan Murray (born 1993), Canadian ice hockey player

S
Sabina Murray (born 1968), Filipina-American screenwriter
Samantha Murray (born 1989), English modern pentathlete
Samantha Murray Sharan (born 1987), British tennis player
Scott Murray (rugby player) (born 1976), Scottish rugby player
Sean Murray (disambiguation)
Shaun Murray (born 1976), US wakeboarder
Shaun Murray (footballer) (born 1970), English footballer
Shirley Murray (1931–2020), New Zealand hymn writer
Simon Murray (disambiguation)
Stephen Murray (disambiguation), several people, including:
Stephen Murray (actor) (1912–1983), British actor
Stephen Murray (historian) (born 1945), British architectural historian
Stephen O. Murray (1950–2019), sociologist, anthropologist, scholar specialising in homosexuality
Stuart Murray (born 1954), politician in Manitoba, Canada
Stuart S. Murray (1898–1980), Vice Admiral of the United States Navy
Suna Murray (born 1955), US figure skater
Sunny Murray James Marcellus Arthur Murray (1936–2017), American free jazz drummer
Sara Murray (born 1968), British entrepreneur and businesswoman

T
T. C. Murray (1873–1959), Irish dramatist
Tavi Murray, 8th woman to win the Polar Medal
Terence Aubrey Murray (1810–1873), politician in New South Wales
Terry Murray (born 1950), Canadian ice hockey player
Therese Murray (born 1947), American politician, President of the Massachusetts Senate
Thomas Murray (disambiguation), including:
Thomas Murray (curler) (1877–1944), Scottish curler
Tim Murray (born 1968), American lawyer
Tom J. Murray (1894–1971), Democratic U.S. Representative from Tennessee (1943–1966)
Tracy Murray (born 1971), American basketball player, coach, and color commentator
Troy Murray (born 1962), Canadian ice hockey player
Ty Murray (born 1969), American champion rodeo cowboy, ex-husband of Jewel

W
Wal Murray (1931–2004), Australian politician
Walter Charles Murray (1866–1945)
Will Murray (writer) (born 1953), American novelist
Willard H. Murray, Jr. (born 1931), American politician
William Murray (disambiguation), multiple people
William H. Murray (Medal of Honor recipient) (1876–1923), American Medal of Honor recipient

Y
Yvonne Murray (born 1964), Scottish athlete

See also
Justice Murray (disambiguation)
Clan Murray
Murry (disambiguation), includes list of people with surname Murry
Moray (name)
Jonathan Marray, a tennis player

References

Surnames of British Isles origin
Anglicised Irish-language surnames
Anglicised Scottish Gaelic-language surnames
Scottish toponymic surnames
English-language surnames